Burkhard Hirsch (29 May 1930 – 11 March 2020) was a German politician and civil liberties advocate. A member of the Free Democratic Party (FDP), Hirsch spent 21 years in the Bundestag (1972–1975, 1980–1998). He also served five years as Minister of the Interior of North Rhine-Westphalia (1975–1980).

Early life and career 
Born in Magdeburg, then part of the Prussian Province of Saxony, Hirsch earned his Abitur in Halle. He studied law and political sciences (Rechts- und Staatswissenschaften) at the University of Marburg. He completed his first and second Staatsexamen in 1954 and 1959, respectively, and earned his Doctor of Laws in 1961 with a doctoral thesis . He worked as a lawyer at the Amts- und Landgericht Düsseldorf from 1964. He was a member of the Wirtschaftsvereinigung Eisen- und Stahlindustrie from 1960 to 1967.

Political career 
Hirsch joined the FDP in 1949 and was a member of their youth organisation Jungdemokraten until 1964. He served on the city council of Düsseldorf from 1964 to 1972 and was president of the regional party from 1971 to 1977. He served on the party's board in North Rhine-Westphalia from 1971 to 2005, and then became its honorary chairman. He first attained a seat in the Bundestag in the 1972 federal election. From 1973 to 2005, he was on the FDP's national board and then became an honorary member. Hirsch left the Bundestag in 1975 to become Minister of the Interior of North Rhine-Westphalia, serving as vice minister-president from 1979. He returned to the Bundestag in 1980. From 1994 to 1998, he was a vice president of the Bundestag.

Later life and death

Hirsch was president of the council of the Hochschule Düsseldorf from 2008 to 2015, with a short interruption. For his influential work for the academy, he was the first to be awarded an honorary citizenship, in May 2016. He died on 11 March 2020. The Hochschule wrote in an obituary:

Awards 
 2016: Honorary citizen (Ehrenbürger of the Hochschule Düsseldorf)
 2006: Honorary doctorate of the Goethe University Frankfurt
 2006: Fritz Bauer Prize of the Humanistische Union
 1998: 
 1998: 
 1976: Theodor-Heuss-Preis of the

References

External links 

 
 Burkhard Hirsch: Die Herrschaftsmaschine (in German) in Süddeutsche Zeitung, 17 May 2010
 Burkhard Hirsch: Dankrede zur Verleihung des Fritz-Bauer-Preises der Humanistischen Union in Freiburg (in German) humanistische-union.de 16 September 2006

1930 births
2020 deaths
Politicians from Magdeburg
20th-century German lawyers
Members of the Bundestag for North Rhine-Westphalia
Members of the Bundestag for the Free Democratic Party (Germany)
Members of the Bundestag 1994–1998
Members of the Bundestag 1990–1994
Members of the Bundestag 1987–1990
Members of the Bundestag 1983–1987
Members of the Bundestag 1980–1983
Members of the Bundestag 1972–1976
University of Marburg alumni